is a 1955 Japanese kaiju film directed by Motoyoshi Oda, with special effects by Eiji Tsuburaya. Produced and distributed by Toho Co., Ltd., it is the second film in the Godzilla franchise. The film stars Hiroshi Koizumi, Setsuko Wakayama, Minoru Chiaki, and Takashi Shimura, with Haruo Nakajima as Godzilla and Katsumi Tezuka as Anguirus. In the film, Japan struggles to survive Godzilla's return, as well as its destructive battle against its ancient foe Anguirus.

Executive producer Iwao Mori instructed producer Tomoyuki Tanaka to immediately commence production on a second Godzilla film, fearing to lose the momentum of the first film's success. Oda was chosen to direct the film as Ishirō Honda was busy directing Lovetide.

Godzilla Raids Again was released theatrically in Japan on April 24, 1955. A re-edited, English dubbed version was released theatrically in the United States on June 2, 1959, by Warner Bros. Pictures, under the title Gigantis, the Fire Monster.

The film was followed by King Kong vs. Godzilla, released on August 11, 1962.

Plot
Working for the Kaiyo Fishing, Inc., a pilot named Shoichi Tsukioka guides a fishing trawler towards a school of Bonito. Koji Kobayashi, another pilot, faces engine troubles and makes an emergency landing on Iwato Island. Tsukioka is sent to rescue Kobayashi, but they both encounter two giant dinosaur-like creatures locked in battle: Godzilla and a new quadruped monster. The pilots escape as the monsters tumble into the sea.

Tsukioka and Kobayashi go to Osaka to help Dr. Yamane and the authorities investigate the encounter. The new monster is identified as an Ankylosaurus and named Anguirus. Dr. Yamane shows the authorities footage of the first Godzilla attack and notes that it was killed by the Oxygen Destroyer, but its inventor died, and that there are no proven countermeasures left against Godzilla. Dr. Yamane suggests issuing a blackout and using drop flares to lure Godzilla away due to the first Godzilla being sensitive to light.

Tsukioka’s girlfriend, Hidemi, expresses her concern for Osaka to him, and he reveals that he thought about her when he thought he might die on Iwato Island. They watch as the Japan Air Self-Defense Force (JASDF) takeoff to find Godzilla, but scientists note that it may prove difficult due to the possibility of Godzilla hiding in caves within the seabed. Later, Godzilla is spotted heading for the Kii Channel between Shikoku and Wakayama Prefecture. Yamaji, Tsukioka’s boss and Hidemi’s father, notes that if Godzilla wreaks havoc in those waters, their fishing company will lose valuable fishing ground and strike a blow at production.

Later, an alert is issued for the Osaka region as Godzilla changes course for Osaka Bay. The Japan Self-Defense Forces (JSDF) cut off the lights in the city and lure Godzilla with flares. Tsukioka leaves Hidemi at her home for safety and leaves with Kobayashi to meet Yamaji at his cannery. Convicts escape from their transport and lead police on a chase that ends with a few convicts crashing into an oil refinery, triggering an explosion, while other convicts escape into Osaka. The explosion lures Godzilla back to Osaka, forcing the JSDF to attack it. Attracted by the flares, Anguirus emerges and engages Godzilla. They move their battle throughout the city, destroying Yamaji’s cannery and killing the convicts in the process. Godzilla kills Anguirus and returns to the sea after burning the body with its atomic breath.

In the aftermath, Yamaji moves operations to Hokkaido to make full use of the fisheries and cannery, and also sends Kobayashi to guide trawlers. During a company dinner, Tsukioka reunites with Tajima, a friend from college, and the war. Kobayashi hints to Hidemi that he’s fallen in love with a certain woman. The dinner is interrupted by news that a ship was sunk by Godzilla. The following morning, Tsukioka helps the JASDF search for Godzilla and tracks its location on Kamiko Island. Kobayashi departs to aide Tsukioka but leaves his notebook behind. Hidemi peaks at the notebook and discovers a picture of her inside.

Kobayashi attempts to stop Godzilla from escaping but is struck by Godzilla’s atomic breath and crashes into the mountaintop, killing him. The crash creates a small avalanche that engulfs Godzilla, inspiring the JASDF to bury it with a bigger avalanche but lack firepower. The JASDF return to base to reload missiles and Tajima reluctantly accepts Tsukioka’s request to take him. The JSDF creates a wall of fire to block Godzilla’s escape, while the JASDF triggers avalanches by blasting the mountaintops. Godzilla exhales one last atomic breath before being completely buried by the last avalanche triggered by Tsukioka. Relieved, Tsukioka lets Kobayashi’s spirit know that they have finally defeated Godzilla.

Cast

Cast taken from Japan's Favorite Mon-star, except where cited otherwise.

Production

Crew

 Motoyoshi Oda – director
 Eiji Tsuburaya – special effects director
 Eiji Iwashiro – assistant director
 Kazuo Baba – production coordinator
 Takeo Kita – art director
 Sadamasa Arikawa – special effects photography
 Akira Watanabe – special effects art director
 Kiroshi Mukoyama – optical effects
 Masayoshi Onuma – lighting
 Masanobu Miyazawa – sound recording
 Ichiro Mitsunawa – sound effects

Personnel taken from Japan's Favorite Mon-star.

Development

A few weeks after Godzilla was released in November 1954, a welcome home party was held for executive producer Iwao Mori. During the party, Mori instructed producer Tomoyuki Tanaka to produce a sequel, due to Mori being pleased with the box office results for the first film.

Ishirō Honda, director of the first Godzilla film, was unavailable to return to direct the sequel due to directing Lovetide at the time. Japanese publications indicated that Tanaka attached Motoyoshi Oda to direct the film, rather than waiting for Honda, due to Mori fearing to lose the momentum of the first Godzilla film's success. Film historians Steve Ryfle and David Kalat deduced that Oda was chosen to direct due to his experience with effects-driven films such as Eagle of the Pacific, and his then-latest film The Invisible Avenger. Kalat added that Oda was a director content with accepting B–picture level assignments, stating, "putting such a man in charge of the Godzilla sequel then was a clear signal of intent: This was to be a quickie profit center, not an artistic indulgence."

Screenwriter Takeo Murata originally wanted to show a scene of chaos and looting in the middle of the monster battle, but time and budget limitations forced him to drop this idea. The Dinosaur Book by Edwin H. Colbert was used during the film's conference scene.

Special effects

The film's special effects were directed by Eiji Tsuburaya. Some of the effects footage was shot at a slower speed, 18 frames per second. Three cameras were set to capture the effects footage. Two cameras were set at high speed, while the third was indirectly left at slow speed. Despite the error, Tsuburaya felt the slow speed footage was usable and since then, used different camera speeds for different scenes. Some Japanese publications identified Yoichi Manoda as the cameraman who accidentally left the third camera on slow speed, while others identified Koichi Takano as the culprit.

Haruo Nakajima portrayed Godzilla and Katsumi Tezuka portrayed Anguirus, respectively. Nakajima and Tezuka were able to move in the suits more fluidly due to the suits being made from lighter materials, as well as casting them from plaster molds to fit the suit performers' physiques. For Godzilla, the new design was sculpted by Teizo Toshimitsu. The Godzilla suit was constructed with a cloth-base where latex was applied over it. A motor was built into the head to move the eyes and mouth, with the batteries built at the base of the tail. Due to this, Nakajima felt discomfort each time he jumped in the suit. For Anguirus, Tezuka had to crawl on his knees with the bottom of his feet exposed. The effects crew hid this by placing trees, buildings, and other obstacles in the foreground and filming from certain angles that hid the hind legs.

Hand puppets were built for close-up shots. The Godzilla puppet had a spray built in to depict the atomic breath. Some of the monster battles were photographed from low angles to emphasize size and scale. The Osaka miniature set was constructed at Toho's then-new soundstage No. 8, which allowed the effects crew more space to work in. The Osaka castle miniature failed to crumble as planned. Wires were attached to the castle that ran beneath the platform. Due to heavy construction, the model failed to collapse even when the suit performers rammed into it as the crew members pulled the wires. Tsuburaya ordered to "cut" but the crew members did not hear him and the castle model collapsed when camera were not rolling. Due to this, the model had to be partially rebuilt. The ice island battle was partially filmed on an outdoor set. To bury Godzilla in ice, an ice machine was borrowed from the Tokyo skating rink.

For the opening scene, Nakajima and Tezuka were required to be in the suits as they plummeted into the water in order to avoid having the suits float upon impact. Several handlers were on-set to prevent Nakajima and Tezuka from drowning. A Godzilla prop equipped with a wind up motor was built to walk during the ice island scenes, however, the prop malfunctioned and was filmed in a stationary position instead. Real snow was added for the ice island set. Several shots of Godzilla reacting to the ice canyon explosions were filmed outdoors in order to avoid filming the roof of the studio set.

Release

Theatrical
Godzilla Raids Again was distributed theatrically in Japan by Toho on April 24, 1955. The film generated 8.3 million tickets, less than what the first Godzilla film drew but still considered moderate business. The film drew little enthusiasm from audiences, the press, and Toho staff. Tanaka later admitted that the crew had little time to prepare and hardly considers the film a success. The Japanese version was released to Japanese speaking theaters in the United States prior to the altered American version. The film was Toho's fourth highest-grossing film of the year domestically, and the 10th highest grossing Japanese release domestically.

A re-edited English dubbed version titled Gigantis, the fire Monster was released theatrically in the United States by Warner Bros. Pictures on May 21, 1959, where it played as a double feature with Teenagers from Outer Space. Some drive-ins paired the film with Rodan.

American version
 
The North American rights to the film were purchased by Harry Rybnick, Richard Kay, Edward Barison, Paul Schreibman, and Edmund Goldman, the same producers who acquired the rights to Godzilla and released it as Godzilla, King of the Monsters!. Instead of dubbing the film, the producers first planned to produce a new film titled The Volcano Monsters, while utilizing the effects footage from the original Japanese film. The producers announced in Variety that filming was expected to commence on June 17, 1957. Rybnick hired Ib Melchior and Edwin Watson to write the screenplay.

Melchior and Watson spent hours watching the Japanese version on a Moviola to build an American story around the footage and to note down footage of the monsters, military mobilization, crowds fleeing, and jets flying and attacking. The duo completed a 129 paged script, dated May 7, 1957, with instructions for the editor of where the Japanese footage was to be used. In their script, Godzilla and Anguirus were changed to dinosaurs, with Godzilla identified as a female Tyrannosaurus. All shots of Godzilla using his atomic breath were eliminated, to be replaced with new footage of Godzilla swiping his claws at jets. Panic, disaster, and military mobilization scenes from news reels were to be included between the Japanese monster footage. The blackout was re-written to signify that the monsters destroyed a power plant. The new effects footage was to be shot at Howard A. Anderson's special effects studio.

Toho approved of the idea and in early 1957, shipped the Godzilla and Anguirus suits to Los Angeles for additional photography. While filming Invasion of the Saucer Men, Bob Burns III and Paul Blaisdell recalled stumbling upon two crates holding the Godzilla and Anguirus suits. Burns recalls that the suits were made out of rubber over canvas and had already been used due to significant burns and damages. Howard A. Anderson Jr. told Burns that they recently received them at the time and were intended for "shooting some inserts."

Rybnick and Barison initially struck a deal with AB-PT Pictures Corp. to co-finance the film but the company closed shop in 1957. Schreibman, Goldman, and then-new financier Newton P. Jacobs decided to dub the film instead. Hugo Grimaldi was hired to oversee the dubbing and editing of the film. Masaru Sato's original music was replaced (except for a couple of tracks) with stock music from various libraries, including the MUTEL library, as well as music from films such as Kronos (1957), Project Moonbase (1958) and The Deerslayer (1957). Godzilla's roar was largely replaced with Anguirus' roar. This version had the working title of Godzilla Raids Again, but was changed to Gigantis, the Fire Monster upon its release. Schreibman took full credit for changing Godzilla's name to Gigantis, which was an attempt to convince audiences that "Gigantis" was a brand new monster, stating, "We called it 'Gigantis' because we did not want it to be confused with 'Godzilla' [who had clearly been killed irreparably by the oxygenator]." At one point, Schreibman inaccurately told reporters that the original Japanese film was called Angirus.

The film was dubbed at Ryder Sound Services in New York and featured the voice talents of Keye Luke, Paul Frees, and George Takei. The English dialogue was based on a loose interpretation, rather than an accurate translation, of the original Japanese dialogue. Credit for the English dialogue script had not been revealed since the release of the film. According to Takei, the word "banana oil" was created by the dub's director due to having difficulty finding a word to match the lip movement of the original Japanese word "bakayaro". Takei stated that people laughed during the recording due to the word being an outdated expression. The English version utilizes stock footage from various films, such as Unknown Island and the first Godzilla film, as well as news reels, military footage, the space program, and educational films.

Prior to the film's release, Schreibman approached Bill Foreman (then-President of Pacific Theaters) and convinced him to purchase the theatrical and television rights to both Gigantis and Teenagers from Outer Space and helped Foreman sell the theatrical rights to Warner Bros. According to the deal, Foreman agreed to show both films in all of his theaters while Warner Bros. would distribute the films to other theaters and were given the American and Latin American theatrical rights to both films for four years.

After the film reverted to Foreman and his attorney Harry B. Swerdlow (who became designated owner of both films because Foreman did not want his name to appear on the copyright notices), they did not pursue any interest in continuing to sell the television rights, which resulted in Gigantis the Fire Monster disappearing from American theatres and television for two decades until the rights reverted to Toho in the mid-1980s.

Critical response
On review aggregator Rotten Tomatoes, the film has an approval rating of 64% based on 11 reviews, with an average rating of 5.00/10.

From contemporary reviews in the United States, Joe R. Patrick of Des Moines Tribune described the film as "amateurish", finding the acting to be "confined primarily to facial expressions, in tight close-ups" and that the film "suffers most of all from dubbed-in English." The review did praise the animation of the monsters as "at times very good, at other times poor," and concluded that the film was not as well made as its double feature, Rodan. Donald Willis of Variety declared the film as being "inept and tedious" but declared the miniature work as "remarkably good" specifically that scenes of "the dinosaur-like animal crunching his way through houses, traffic and high-tension wires are interesting and exciting."

Ishirō Honda (director of the previous Godzilla film) noted that reviews for Godzilla Raids Again were more positive compared to the previous film, stating that it was considered "stupid" by the media for a director to add "ideas or themes" into a science fiction film, he commented, "That's why I think that the first Godzilla was only considered a 'weird' movie. That's probably why they liked the second movie much better." Film historian Steve Ryfle noted that some writers felt that while Godzilla (1954) was a metaphor for the Hiroshima bombing, Godzilla Raids Again serves as metaphor for the Nagasaki bombing. Ryfle noted the scene of Hidemi gazing at the flames of Osaka strikes parallels with the imagery of a mushroom cloud.

Home media

Japan
In 1982, the Japanese version was released on VHS in Japan by Toho. In 1986, Toho released the film on LaserDisc. In 1991, Toho reissued the film on VHS. In 1993, Toho released a new master of the film on LaserDisc. In 2001, Toho released the film on DVD. In 2005, Toho included the film on the Godzilla Final Box DVD Set. In 2014, Toho released the film on Blu-ray.

In 2008, Toho remastered the film in High-definition and premiered it on the Japanese Movie Speciality Channel, along with the rest of the Godzilla films also remastered in HD.

International
In 1989, Video Treasures released the American version on EP and LP VHS in the United States and Canada. In 2007, Classic Media and Sony BMG Home Entertainment released both the Japanese and American versions on DVD in the United States and Canada. The special features include an audio commentary by Steve Ryfle, a featurette titled The Art of Suit Acting by Ed Godziszewski and Bill Gudmundson, and a slideshow of the film's theatrical posters. Per Toho's request, the original title card for Gigantis, the Fire Monster was replaced with a new title card sporting the film's official English title.

In 2017, Janus Films and The Criterion Collection acquired the film, as well as other Godzilla titles, to stream on Starz and FilmStruck. In 2019, the Japanese version was included as part of a Blu-ray box set released by The Criterion Collection, which includes all 15 films from the franchise's Shōwa era. In May 2020, the Japanese version became available on HBO Max upon its launch.

Legacy
The film was followed by King Kong vs. Godzilla, released on August 11, 1962. Godzilla Raids Again introduced the monster vs. monster formula that would be become prominent and synonymous with the franchise. After the release of the film, Toho featured Anguirus in various multimedia (see Appearances).

Notes

References

Sources

External links

 Godzilla Raids Again at the official Godzilla website by Toho Co., Ltd. 
 
 
 
 
 ゴジラの逆襲 (Gojira no Gyakushū) at Japanese Movie Database 

1955 films
1950s science fiction films
Films scored by Masaru Sato
Films directed by Motoyoshi Oda
Puppet films
Films produced by Tomoyuki Tanaka
Films set in Osaka
Giant monster films
Godzilla films
Japanese black-and-white films
1950s Japanese-language films
Japanese sequel films
Kaiju films
1950s monster movies
Toho films
1950s Japanese films